Dr Meirion Pennar (24 December 1944 – 9 December 2010) was a Welsh poet and academic, who translated two works of Welsh language literature.

Early life
Born in Cardiff, he was the eldest of five children born to theologian and writer, Dr Pennar Davies. Brought up in Bangor, Brecon and Swansea, he graduated with an honours degree in Welsh from Swansea University, and was then a research student at Jesus College, Oxford, where he gained his D.Phil.

Career
Pennar became a lecturer in Welsh in Dublin, and was then appointed lecturer in the Welsh Department, University of Wales, Lampeter from 1975. It was here that he specialised in medieval Welsh poetry and the Welsh novel in the 19th Century, completing his translations of Book of Taliesin poems and The Black Book of Carmarthen, both of which remain in print. He also published two volumes of poetry, Syndod y Sêr and Pair Dadeni, and two long poems, Saga and Y Gadwyn. He resigned his position at Lampeter in 1993.

A language and political campaigner in the 1970s with the Cymdeithas yr Iaith Gymraeg (Welsh Language Society), he became a political columnist with Y Ddraig Goch, and was a parliamentary candidate for Plaid Cymru in the Swansea West constituency.

Personal life
Meirion Pennar lived in Llandysul, Adpar, and Newcastle Emlyn, during which period he had a son. He returned in 2000 to Swansea to care for his ageing mother and younger brother, Geraint. He died in Swansea on 9 December 2010.

Publications

References

Writers from Cardiff
Alumni of Swansea University
Alumni of Jesus College, Oxford
Academics of the University of Wales, Lampeter
Plaid Cymru politicians
1944 births
2010 deaths
20th-century Welsh poets